Pushan (also Romanized as Pūshān; also known as Fūshān) is a village in Bizaki Rural District, Golbajar District, Chenaran County, Razavi Khorasan Province, Iran. At the 2006 census, its population was 505, in 127 families.

References 

Populated places in Chenaran County